The Spit Bridge, a steel and concrete girder bridge with a bascule lift span across the Middle Harbour, is located  north-east of the central business district in Sydney, Australia. The bridge carries The Spit Road (A8) from a point called The Spit, and connects the suburbs of Mosman, on the south bank and Seaforth, on the north bank.

History

Sydney's Lower North Shore and Northern Beaches were serviced initially by a rowing boat from as early as 1829. A hand-operated punt service began in 1850 and continued until 1889, when it was replaced by a steam punt.

The inhabitants of the Manly area first requested a bridge in the 1870s and the first plans for one were made in the following decade. In 1912, Member of Parliament Richard Arthur lobbied the State Government to build a bridge, but was told that the planned construction of the Sydney Harbour Bridge made this unlikely. World War I pushed the issue aside but more calls for a bridge were made in 1919.

In 1922, the cost of a bridge was estimated at £150,000 by the Public Works Committee, a price that Manly Council said would cover a 205-metre-long concrete bridge, resting on 18 arches of varying lengths, with two sets of tram lines, two roadways and two footpaths. Eventually, in late 1923, the Council decided to build a bridge itself on a cost of £40,000 to £60,000 with a low height design made from timber that was 213m long, with a roadway 5.5m wide and room for one covered footpath, but no tram lines.

In 1924, The (first) Spit Bridge was completed and opened. By 1927 the timber lowlevel bridge saw a 60% growth over that of the punt for the year prior to the bridge opening. The amount of traffic using the bridge was higher than expected and the subsequent revenue from tolls providing a financial boon for the government.

Various plans were considered to reduce congestion including a high-level bridge and a bridge further upstream, leaving the existing bridge for local traffic; however none were enacted until after World War II. The NSW Government decided to build another lowlevel bridge at the same site.

Description

Construction of the current bridge by Cleveland Bridge & Engineering Company had commenced in 1952 and after delays was completed in 1958; and opened on 19 November 1958.

The Spit Bridge over Middle Harbour can be described as a steel and concrete girder bridge with a bascule lift span. There are three spans at either end of the opening span. Each of the six fixed spans have four welded plate girders as the main members, with cross girders, but without stringers or horizontal bracing. The concrete deck is dowelled to the steelwork. The opening span (Span 4) is a single-leaf bascule. It has two main girders, with cross girders and stringers, covered by an open mesh steel deck.

The two footways are of concrete on the fixed spans, and steel on the bascule span. At the Manly end the harbour bottom slopes up steeply to outcropping rock on which the northern abutment sits. Piers 5 and 6 are double cylinder piers sitting on bedrock below the harbour bed. The main pier which supports the bascule span is Pier 4. The pier is box-like and supports all machinery for the operation of the bascule, including the operator's cabin. The approaches and abutments at each end are varied due to the nature of the topography. The southern abutment is built up from the sandy beach level and has a retaining wall faced with stone on either side. The northern abutment is resting directly on the rock on the western side and is built up on the eastern side with a retaining wall. Due to the variation in ground level on each shore there is a grade of 2.68% from south to north. Traffic across the bridge is regulated by traffic lights at either end (located at the end of Spans 2 and 6) and by roadway gates which operate as the bridge is about to open.

The bridge has two traffic lanes in each direction, with a tidal flow system established, while the approaches to it have three lanes in each direction. In 2007, the Roads & Traffic Authority found that traffic either side of the bridge doesn't return to normal for 15 minutes after the bridge is opened and reduced the number of bridge opening times.

Grade-separated shared pedestrian footpaths and cycleways are located on the bridge's western (upriver) and eastern (downriver) sides.

Heritage listing 
The Spit Bridge was listed on the Roads & Traffic Authority heritage and conservation register on 24 November 2003:

Congestion and bypassing project
The next crossing of Middle Harbour is some distance upstream (north-west) at Roseville Bridge. The Roads & Traffic Authority announced in August 2006 that tenders had been called for widening of the bridge to six lanes, with two extra traffic lanes and a pedestrian/cycleway being added on the western side, and upgrades to the lifting mechanism. Construction was to have begun in 2007, however, the project was scrapped in May of that year. According to the government this was due to technical and engineering difficulties, according to the opposition it was because of political considerations. The increased cost estimates to $115 million were deemed to be not justifiable by the Minister for Roads Eric Roozendaal and the fiveyear plan was abandoned.

Traffic delays either side of The Spit Bridge have been a problem for many years, not only on the approaches to the bridge itself, but also far up the hills on either side. Proposals to ameliorate delays have included widening the bridge, a tunnel linking the Warringah Expressway and the Burnt Bridge Creek Deviation, and a high-level bridge in place of the existing one. David Barr, the member for Manly, claimed in 2002 that the latter two were too expensive with $200 million estimated for a high-level bridge, and $1 billion for the tunnel. In 2009 it was reported that the Labor Government was reviewing a proposal for a tunnel from Cammeray to The Spit, linked to a new, higher bridge that would be able to let boats through without the need to be opened.

In 2014, Premier Mike Baird, also the member for Manly, announced plans to bypass Mosman and The Spit Bridge by constructing a $2–3 billion tunnel from Seaforth to Neutral Bay that would run underground beneath Military Road. In 2017, NSW Premier Gladys Berejiklian announced that the NSW Government will provide $77 million towards the construction of a tunnel to bypass The Spit Bridge as part of the Western Harbour Tunnel & Beaches Link project. The tunnel, which is expected to take five years to build, will connect the Warringah Freeway from Cammeray and cross underneath Middle Harbour to meet up with the Burnt Bridge Creek deviation at Balgowlah. The proposed tunnel will be located west of The Spit Bridge.

See also

 List of bridges in Sydney

References

External links

The Spit Bridge opening times

  [CC-By-SA]

Bridges in Sydney
Bridges completed in 1958
Bridges completed in 1924
Bascule bridges
1958 establishments in Australia
Roads with a reversible lane
Former toll bridges in Australia
The Spit, New South Wales
Road bridges in New South Wales
Steel bridges in Australia
Concrete bridges in Australia